Pardines can refer to:

 Pardines, Puy-de-Dôme, a commune in the Puy-de-Dôme department in Auvergne in central France.
 Pardines, Girona, a municipality in the province of Girona, Catalonia, Spain.